Libertador General San Martín is a town in Jujuy Province, Argentina, and capital of the Ledesma Department, located on the National Route Nº34.

The town was founded under the name of Pueblo Nuevo Ledesma in 1899, on an area donated by the owners of the Ledesma sugar refinery. Two years later, the outline and later subdivision of the eight blocks surrounding the main square was made.

In 1906 the railroad arrived, and the station was built half way from the town to the industrial centre. The area was enjoyed an economic expansion strengthened by the first Lebanese and Syrian immigration. In 1950 the town was renamed after the Libertador General San Martín. Ledesma S.A.A.I. remains the town's largest employer. The firm maintains sugarcane plantations; fruit orchards, packaging and concentrate facilities; sugar, cellulose, and paper mills; and alcohol fuel facilities.

Located on the banks of the San Francisco River, and only  from the entrance to the Calilegua National Park, tourism in the area has recently started to grow. Hot springs and trekking routes are some of the other touristic attractions available to the visitors.

Notable people
 
 
José María Paz (born 1978), Argentine football player

References

External links
Visit San Martín
Libertador Hoy

Populated places in Jujuy Province
Populated places established in 1899
Cities in Argentina
Argentina
Jujuy Province